The Patuxent Formation is a Cretaceous geologic formation of the Atlantic coastal plain.

Description
The Patuxent formation was first described by William Bullock Clark in 1897.  The formation is primarily unconsolidated white-grey or orange-brown sand and  gravel, with minor clay and silt. The sand often contains kaolinized feldspar, making it an arkose.  Clay lumps are common, and sand beds gradually transition to clay. Sandy beds may be crossbedded, which is evidence of shallow water origin.

The Patuxent is the basal unit of the Coastal Plain sedimentary formations and unconformably overlies the crystalline basement rocks. This underlying unconformity is the subsurface equivalent of the Atlantic Seaboard Fall Line.

Fossils
Propanoplosaurus, a nodosaurid known from a single natural cast and mold of a hatchling, was found recovered from rocks belonging to the Patuxent Formation in Maryland. 

Fossil stegosaur tracks have been reported from the formation.

E. Dorf (1952) compared the flora identified in the Patuxent to that of the Wealden Flora in England studied by Albert Seward.

Pollen spores have been identified in the formation by G. J. Brenner (1963).

Notable exposures
The type locality is the upper and lower valleys of the Little Patuxent River and Big Patuxent River in  Maryland.

Economic value
The Patuxent is a notable aquifer in southern Maryland.

Age
Biostratigraphic dating by Dorf (1952) confirmed Early Cretaceous (Neocomian) age.

See also

 List of dinosaur-bearing rock formations
 List of stratigraphic units with ornithischian tracks
 Stegosaur tracks

Footnotes

References
 Weishampel, David B.; Dodson, Peter; and Osmólska, Halszka (eds.): The Dinosauria, 2nd, Berkeley: University of California Press. 861 pp. .

Cretaceous Maryland
Cretaceous geology of Virginia
Aptian Stage

Lower Cretaceous Series of North America